Michelle Ronksley-Pavia, born in Sheffield, England, is an emerging artist in Australia. She is also a researcher in education, writer and art teacher, particularly of gifted children. Ronksley-Pavia has participated in conferences and discussions at embassies, World, National and State conferences on the education of gifted and talented students and those termed twice-exceptional (gifted students with learning disabilities).

Ronksley-Pavia has a Master's Degree in Gifted and Talented Education. She is currently engaged as a PhD candidate at a Queensland university where she is researching perceptions of underachievement in twice-exceptional students; she has published numerous journal articles on gifted and talented children.

Ronksley-Pavia studied for eight years in Belgium at the École des Beaux Arts in Brussels. While in Europe she was greatly influenced by the works of the impressionists and the Belgian surrealist painter René Magritte. 
She emigrated to Australia where she became a citizen in 1994. She joined the National Association for the Visual Arts (NAVA). In 1995 she was included in the D.W. Thorpe publication of The Who's Who of Australian Visual Artists.

Ronksley-Pavia’s themes generally delve into the human unconscious using scientific subject matter with overtones of religious and particularly ethical questions with regard to DNA cloning, inequalities, particularly disability and racial issues. She has become increasingly interested in the mixing of science and art. She was particularly interested in Karl Jung’s archetypes of the collective unconscious and symbolism.

References

  TICAL School Leadership Summit
Ronksley-Pavia, Michelle (1974 - ), National Foundation for Australian Women, Australian Women's Archives Project Web Site
Artworkers 

 A Report on Acceleration for the Gifted: What Does it Mean? 

 Feeling it All: Overexcitabilities and the Gifted 
The Daily Telegraph (Australia) Newspaper, Sydney, New South Wales, Australia, Front Page and page 4 morning edition, 8 March 2000
Churchie emerging art
National Association for the Visual Arts. The Who’s Who of Australian Visual Artists, 2nd ed. D. W. Thorpe, Melbourne, 1995

External links 
Visual arts, Michelle Ronksley-Pavia 
Gold Coast Newsletter
 Queensland Association for Gifted and Talented Children, 
 Teacher Training Australia 
 Who's Who of Australian Women 

Year of birth missing (living people)
English emigrants to Australia
Living people
Australian women painters
Western Sydney University alumni
21st-century Australian women artists
21st-century Australian artists
Artists from Sheffield